The 1979 NCAA Division I Tennis Championships were the 34th annual tournaments to determine the national champions of NCAA men's college tennis. Matches were played during May 1979 at the Dan Magill Tennis Complex in Athens, Georgia on the campus of the University of Georgia. A total of three championships were contested: men's team, singles, and doubles.

The men's team championship was won by the UCLA Bruins, their 13th team national title. UCLA defeated Trinity (TX) in the final round, 5–3. The men's singles title was won by Kevin Curren from Texas, and the men's doubles title went to Erick Iskersky and Ben McKown of  Trinity (TX).

Team tournament

See also
NCAA Division I Women's Tennis Championship (from 1982)
NCAA Men's Division II Tennis Championship
NCAA Men's Division III Tennis Championship

References

External links
List of NCAA Men's Tennis Champions
List of NCAA Women's Tennis Champions

NCAA Division I tennis championships
NCAA  Division I Tennis Championships
NCAA  Division I Tennis Championships
NCAA Division I Tennis Championships